Rory Sutherland (born 8 February 1982) is an Australian former professional road bicycle racer, who rode professionally between 2005 and 2020, for the , , , ,  and  teams.

After retiring, Sutherland became the Elite Road Coordinator for the Australian cycling team.

Career
He tested positive for Clomiphene, which according to some medical experts is not a performance-enhancing drug although it is on the World Anti-Doping Agency's (WADA) banned substance list. In 2006 Sutherland was given a 9-month conditional suspension by the Belgian Cycling Federation, with whom he holds a racing licence. He was named in the start list for the 2015 Vuelta a España. In 2007, he won stages 2 and 3 of the Redlands Bicycle Classic, and also finished 2nd in the Australian National Time Trial Championships.

In July 2018, he was named in the start list for the Tour de France.

Major results

2000
 4th Time trial, UCI Junior Road World Championships
2003
 2nd Ronde van Vlaanderen U23
 6th Overall Ster Elektrotoer
2004
 1st  Road race, National Under-23 Road Championships
 1st Flèche Hesbignonne
 2nd Overall Olympia's Tour
1st Stage 9
 3rd Overall Le Triptyque des Monts et Châteaux
 5th Rund um den Henninger Turm U23
 9th Overall Istrian Spring Trophy
2005
 2nd Time trial, National Road Championships
 3rd Overall Danmark Rundt
1st  Young rider classification
 3rd Grote Prijs Jef Scherens
 9th Schaal Sels
 10th Overall Vuelta a Murcia
2007
 1st Overall USA Cycling National Racing Calendar
 2nd Time trial, National Road Championships
 7th Reading Classic
2008
 1st  Overall Nature Valley Grand Prix
1st Stage 5
 1st  Overall Joe Martin Stage Race
1st Prologue
 1st  Overall Mount Hood Cycling Classic
1st Stage 3
 1st Prologue Redlands Bicycle Classic
 National Road Championships
2nd Time trial
3rd Road race
 9th Overall Jayco Bay Cycling Classic
 9th Overall Tour de Georgia
2009
 1st  Overall Joe Martin Stage Race
 1st  Overall Nature Valley Grand Prix
 6th Overall Redlands Bicycle Classic
 10th Overall Tour of Missouri
2010
 1st  Overall Cascade Cycling Classic
 1st  Overall Nature Valley Grand Prix
 7th Overall Tour of California
 8th Overall Tour of the Gila
2011
 Nature Valley Grand Prix
1st Stages 1 & 6
 6th Overall Settimana Internazionale di Coppi e Bartali
 7th Overall Tour of California
 9th Overall Tour of Elk Grove
 10th Overall USA Pro Cycling Challenge
2012
 1st  Overall Tour of the Gila
1st Stage 1
 1st  Overall Tour de Beauce
 1st Stage 1 Tour of Utah
 1st Stage 6 USA Pro Cycling Challenge
 9th Bucks County Classic
2013
 6th Klasika Primavera
 9th Overall USA Pro Cycling Challenge
 9th Overall Tour of Turkey
 10th Overall Circuit de la Sarthe
2014
 5th Grand Prix de Wallonie
2017
 1st Vuelta a La Rioja

Grand Tour general classification results timeline

References

External links

Rory's Rider Stats on VELOBIOS
Rory Sutherland's diary on Cyclingnews
Profile on team website

1982 births
Living people
Australian male cyclists
Sportspeople from Canberra
Sportsmen from the Australian Capital Territory
Cyclists from the Australian Capital Territory